The Hebrew / Yiddish surname Chayat (Polonized variants: Chajat, Chajit , Chajet, Chajetan ) may be derived from the occupation of tailor or , chayah, animal, life. Notable people with the surname include:

Naftali Chayat, founder of Vayyar, Israeli semiconductor company
Sherry Chayat, American Zen Buddhist
 (1947-2011), Israeli painter, sculptor, poet and writer

See also
Hayat (disambiguation)
Hayyoth (names)

References

Hebrew-language surnames